Seven Brave Men is a 1936 Soviet action drama film directed by Sergey Gerasimov.

Plot 
Six researchers visit the Arctic. When they unpack the cargo, they find another man - Petr Moliboga, with whom they will survive the winter.

Starring 
 Nikolay Bogolyubov as Capt. Ilya Letnikov (as N. Bogolyubov)
 Tamara Makarova as Dr. Zhenya Okhrimenko
 Ivan Novoseltsev as Bogun (pilot) (as I. Novoseltsev)
 Oleg Zhakov as Kurt Shefer (radioman) (as O. Zhakov)
 Pyotr Aleynikov as Moliboga (stowaway / cook) (as P. Aleinikov)
 Andrei Apsolon as Osya Korfunkel (meteorologist) (as A. Apsolon)
 Ivan Kuznetsov as Sasha Rybnikov (as I. Kuznetsov)

References

External links 

1936 films
1930s Russian-language films
1930s action drama films
Soviet action drama films
Soviet black-and-white films
1936 drama films